Nicolai Høgh (born 9 November 1983) is a Danish footballer who plays as a defender for Danish Second Division side Greve IF.
He spent ten seasons with Esbjerg fB, before joining in Vålerenga in July 2013.

Career

Club
In June 2013, Høgh signed a 2.5-year contract with Tippeligaen side Vålerenga Fotball.

Honours
Esbjerg fB
Danish Cup: 2012–13

References

External links
National team profile
Career statistics at Danmarks Radio

1983 births
Living people
Danish men's footballers
Denmark under-21 international footballers
Denmark youth international footballers
Esbjerg fB players
Vålerenga Fotball players
Akademisk Boldklub players
Danish Superliga players
Eliteserien players
Danish expatriate men's footballers
Expatriate footballers in Norway
Danish expatriate sportspeople in Norway
Association football defenders